Ba is a village in the municipality of Ljig in central Serbia. According to the 2002 census, the village has a population of 605. It lies below Mount Suvobor.

During World War II, Ba was a stronghold of the Serbian royalist Chetnik movement. Between 25 and 28 January 1944, Chetniks led by Draža Mihailović met there for discussion in what became known as the Ba Congress. For that reason the village was neglected by post-war Communist authorities.

See also
 List of short place names

References

Populated places in Kolubara District